The Legend of Hero is a 2005 Taiwanese television series adapted from the Hong Kong manhua series Chinese Hero: Tales of the Blood Sword by Ma Wing-shing. The series was produced by Young Pei-pei and starred Peter Ho and Ady An in the leading roles.

Plot
Hua Yingxiong is forced to flee from his homeland in China after killing the Westerners who murdered his parents. He leaves behind his childhood friend and love interest, Chen Jieyu. After escaping, he mistakenly boards a ship for labourers and is sold to work  in America. While in America, Hua sees his fellow countrymen being oppressed and bullied by foreigners. He is unable to tolerate that and stands up against the foreigners, but is attacked by them. Just then, he is rescued by Jin Ao, a powerful swordsman. Jin accepts him as a student and teaches him martial arts. Hua uses his skills to survive in a dangerous environment, where he faces gang wars, murder, treachery and racial discrimination.

Cast
 Peter Ho as Hua Yingxiong
 Ady An as Chen Jieyu
 Lan Cheng-lung as Mu Xi
 Qin Lan as Mu Xiuluo
 Zheng Guolin as Guipu
 Chen Guanlin as Jin Taibao
 Liu Weihua as Jin Longtou
 Li Li-chun as Jin Ao
 Feng Shaofeng as Li Qianjun
 Ma Yashu
 Cao Ying

See also
 Chinese Hero: Tales of the Blood Sword
 A Man Called Hero
 The Blood Sword
 The Blood Sword 2

External links
  The Legend of Hero on Sina.com
  The Legend of Hero on Xinhuanet

2005 Taiwanese television series debuts
Taiwanese wuxia television series
Adaptations of works by Ma Wing-shing
Television shows based on manhua
Discrimination in fiction